The 2005–06 Israel State Cup (Gvia HaMedina) was the 67th season of Israel's nationwide football cup competition and the 52nd after the Israeli Declaration of Independence.

The competition was won by Hapoel Tel Aviv, who had beaten Bnei Yehuda 1–0 at the final. 

By winning, Hapoel Tel Aviv qualified for the second round of the UEFA Cup.

Results

Ninth Round

Round of 16

Quarter-finals

Semi-finals

Final

References
100 Years of Football 1906-2006, Elisha Shohat (Israel), 2006
Israel Cup 2005/06 RSSSF

External links
 Israel Football Association website

Israel State Cup
State Cup
Israel State Cup seasons